"I Know" is a song by American R&B singer Dionne Farris. Written by Milton Davis and William DuVall, it was released in January 1995 as the first single from Farris' debut album, Wild Seed – Wild Flower (1994). The song was a hit in Farris's native United States, peaking at number four on the Billboard Hot 100, and it also spent 10 consecutive weeks at number one on the Billboard Mainstream Top 40, staying 28 weeks on the chart.

Outside the US, "I Know" reached number one in Canada, where it was the 19th-most-successful single of the year. It also achieved moderate success in Australia, France, Germany, Iceland, New Zealand, and the United Kingdom. Radio & Records magazine ranked "I Know" as the most played song on mainstream Top 40/CHR radio stations for 1995, spending nine weeks atop the chart and 19 weeks in the top 10. It was nominated for the Grammy Award for Best Female Pop Vocal Performance in 1996. Davis and DuVall won an ASCAP Pop Award for writing the song in 1996.

Critical reception
Dave Sholin from the Gavin Report wrote, "A sensational talent has emerged from Arrested Development and her name is Dionne Farris. Kent Zimmerman [editor] ran up and the down the hall screaming about this weeks ago and even recommended it to his A3 panel. Early airplay indicates Top 40 programmers agree." Charles Aaron from Spin felt the vocalist "relates her story of a too-late lover with carefully measured soul that reads Club VH-1. But the kick comes from a peek-a-boo slide guitar, weaving in and out of the nimble beats and subtle tambourine like a generational flare. It's as if Farris runs down the whole relationship scene for a front porch full of aunts and uncles and grandparents, all of whom nod in rhythm." Mike Joyce from The Washington Post described "I Know" as "a bluesy, slide guitar-riffed admonition".

Track listings

 US maxi-CD single
 "I Know" (single edit) – 3:25
 "People" – 4:45
 "I Know" (NY reprise mix) – 3:49
 "I Wish I Knew How It Would Feel to Be Free" – 4:39
 "I Know" (acoustic roots – extended edit) – 5:03

 US cassette single
A. "I Know" – 3:47
B. "Human" – 3:04

 UK CD1
 "I Know" (radio version)
 "I Know" (NY reprise mix)
 "Human"
 "The 11th Hour" (edit)

 UK CD2
 "I Know" (radio version)
 "I Know" (NY reprise mix)
 "I Know" (acoustic roots extended mix)
 "People"

 UK cassette single
 "I Know" (radio version)
 "Human"

 European CD single
 "I Know" (single edit) – 3:23
 "I Know" (acoustic roots – extended) – 6:01

 Australian CD and cassette single
 "I Know" (single edit)
 "I Know" (acoustic roots – extended)
 "I Know" (NY reprise mix)

 Japanese CD single
 "I Know" (single version)
 "Stop the Think"
 "People"
 "I Know" (acoustic roots – extended)

Charts

Weekly charts

Year-end charts

All-time charts

Release history

References

1995 debut singles
1995 songs
Columbia Records singles
Dionne Farris songs
RPM Top Singles number-one singles
Songs written by Milton Davis
Songs written by William DuVall